Corbin Tomaszeski (born c. 1972) is a Canadian restaurant consultant and celebrity chef based in Toronto, Ontario. He is known for his appearances on the Food Network shows Restaurant Makeover and Dinner Party Wars. He graduated from the Northern Alberta Institute of Technology. Tomaszeski was formerly the executive chef at the Westin Harbour Castle Hotel and conference center in Toronto

References

External links
 Corbin on Food Network

1970s births
Living people
Canadian television chefs
People from Toronto
Participants in Canadian reality television series
Northern Alberta Institute of Technology alumni
Canadian male chefs